Bağpınar is a village in the central district of Şırnak Province in Turkey. The village is populated by Kurds of the Botikan tribe and had a population of 24 in 2021. The hamlet of Çanaklı is attached to Bağpınar.

The village was depopulated in the 1990s during the Kurdish–Turkish conflict.

References 

Kurdish settlements in Şırnak Province
Villages in Şırnak District